Paladin Stadium is a 16,000-seat stadium located near Greenville, South Carolina, USA. It was built in 1981 at a cost of $2 million, and originally seated 13,200 fans.  It was expanded to its current capacity in 1985, and is currently home to the Furman Paladins football team. The stadium was converted to field turf before the 2013 season.

In addition to football, Paladin Stadium is also used for graduation ceremonies and concerts.

On January 9, 2023, the Greenville Triumph and Greenville Liberty soccer teams announced Paladin Stadium as their homes for the 2023 USL League One and USL W League seasons.

Gallery

See also
 List of NCAA Division I FCS football stadiums

References

College football venues
Furman Paladins football
American football venues in South Carolina
Sports venues in Greenville, South Carolina
Sports venues completed in 1981
1981 establishments in South Carolina
Soccer venues in South Carolina
USL League One stadiums
Greenville Triumph SC
USL W League